, provisional designation , is an extrem trans-Neptunian object from the extended scattered disc on a highly eccentric orbit in the outermost region of the Solar System. The rather reddish extended scattered disc object belongs to the group of extreme trans-Neptunian objects. It was discovered on 4 November 2007 by astronomers Andrew Becker, Andrew Puckett and Jeremy Kubica at the Apache Point Observatory in New Mexico, United States.

Orbit and classification 

 orbits the Sun at a distance of 35.1–347 AU once every 2640 years and 11 months (964,601 days; semi-major axis of 191.1 AU). Its orbit has an exceptionally high eccentricity of 0.82 and an inclination of 12° with respect to the ecliptic. The body's observation arc begins with a precovery taken during the Sloan Digital Sky Survey at Apache Point in November 2000. It has a minimum orbital intersection distance with Neptune of 5.4 AU.

It belongs to a small group of detached objects with perihelion distances of 30 AU or more, and semi-major axes of 150 AU or more. These extreme trans-Neptunian objects (ETNOs) can not reach such orbits without some perturbing object, which lead to the speculation of Planet Nine.

Numbering and naming 

This minor planet was numbered by the Minor Planet Center on 18 May 2019. As of 2019, it has not been named.

Physical characteristics 

This ETNO's color is rather reddish with an intermediary IR spectral type and a B–R color index of 1.44.

Diameter and albedo 

According to the Johnston's archive and to American astronomer Michael Brown,  measures 202 and 279 kilometers in diameter based on an assumed albedo of 0.09 and 0.04, respectively. On his website, Michael Brown lists this object as "possibly" a dwarf planet (200–400 km) which is the least certain class in his 5-class taxonomic system.

Rotation period and shape 

As of 2019, no rotational lightcurve of has been obtained from photometric observations. The body's rotation period, pole and shape remain unknown.

See also

References

External links 
 List Of Centaurs and Scattered-Disk Objects, Minor Planet Center
 
 

527603
527603
Discoveries by Andrew C. Becker
Discoveries by Andrew W. Puckett
Discoveries by Jeremy Martin Kubica
527603
20071104